Liang Yushuai is a Chinese taekwondo practitioner. He won the gold medal in the men's bantamweight event at the 2022 World Taekwondo Championships held in Guadalajara, Mexico. He also won the silver medal in his event at the 2022 Asian Taekwondo Championships held in Chuncheon, South Korea.

In 2019, he won the silver medal in the 58 kg event at the Military World Games held in Wuhan, China.

References

External links
 

Living people
Year of birth missing (living people)
Place of birth missing (living people)
Chinese male taekwondo practitioners
World Taekwondo Championships medalists
Asian Taekwondo Championships medalists
21st-century Chinese people